Jelili Ogunmuyiwa (born March 31, 1979) is a Nigerian football referee who currently operates in the Nigeria Premier League and also international beach soccer tournaments. Born in Ikorodu, Lagos State, Jelili was selected to officiate the final match of the 2015 CAF Beach Soccer Championship between Senegal and Madagascar. Jelili officiated 4 matches at the 2015 FIFA Beach Soccer World Cup after he had previously officiated at the 2011 tournament.

Accolades
1st Nigeria Pitch Awards – Referee of the Year

References

External links
Jelili Ogunmuyiwa on FIFA

1979 births
Living people
Nigerian football referees
People from Lagos State
FIFA World Cup referees